The European Securities and Markets Authority (ESMA) is an independent European Union Authority located in Paris.

ESMA replaced the Committee of European Securities Regulators (CESR) on 1 January 2011. It is one of the three new European Supervisory Authorities set up within the European System of Financial Supervisors.  


Overview
ESMA works in the field of securities legislation and regulation to improve the functioning of financial markets in Europe, strengthening investor protection and co-operation between national competent authorities.

The idea behind ESMA is to establish an "EU-wide financial markets watchdog". One of its main tasks is to regulate credit rating agencies. In 2010, credit rating agencies were criticized for the lack of transparency in their assessments and for a possible conflict of interest. At the same time, the impact of the assigned ratings became significant not only for companies and banks but also for states.

In October 2017, ESMA organised its first conference which was held in Paris. The event examined issues critical to European financial markets and was attended by 350 participants.

ESMA's product intervention measures
On 1 August 2018, the ESMA implemented modified trading restrictions concerning contracts for difference (CFDs) and spread betting for retail clients. The most significant change was that binary options will be completely banned, while the CFD leverage that retail clients can trade with will be restricted to 30:1 and 2:1, depending on the volatility of the underlying asset traded. These restrictions applied to traders categorized as retail investors only. Experienced traders, which fall under the category of professional clients, were excluded. This also meant that professional clients did not receive the same investor protections as retail investors. The restrictions, initially imposed as a temporary measure, were renewed on 1 February 2019 ,for a further three-month period. On 31 July 2019, the ESMA announced that it will not renew the restrictions after they expire on 1 August 2019, as all the EU member countries have managed to implement similar restrictions on the national level.

Questions and answers (Q&A) 
To ensure the consistent day-to-day application of Union law within ESMA's remit, one of the organisations' key contributions is the production and maintenance of Q&As. To open the process, ESMA launched in February 2017 a new process allowing stakeholders to submit a Q&A. Once scrutinised, if these Q&As are selected, they are published in English on ESMA's website.

Leadership

Chair: 
 Verena Ross (since 1 November 2021)
 Anneli Tuominen (interim chair, 2021)
 Steven Maijoor (1 April 2011 - 31 March 2021)

Vice-Chair: 
 Vojtěch Belling (since 21 November 2022)
 Erik Thedéen (December 2021 - November 2022)
 Anneli Tuominen (2016 - 2022)

Executive Director: 
 Natasha Cazenave (1 June 2021)
 Verena Ross (2011-2021)

See also 

 Capital Markets Union
 Banking Union
 MiFid II
 European Supervisory Authorities
 European Banking Authority
 European Insurance and Occupational Pensions Authority

References

External links
 
 Regulation (EU) No 1095/2010 of the European Parliament and of the Council of 24 November 2010 establishing a European Supervisory Authority (European Securities and Markets Authority)
 Larosière report

2011 in the European Union
Agencies of the European Union
Capital markets of Europe
European Union financial market policy
Financial regulatory authorities
Government agencies established in 2011
Organizations based in Paris
2011 establishments in France
Securities and exchange commissions
Regulation in the European Union

sv:Europeiska systemet för finansiell tillsyn#Europeiska värdepappers- och marknadsmyndigheten